Elspeth Anderson Whyte (born 24 December 1926), later known as Elspeth Stephanson, is a British athlete. Whyte was born in Hendon, Middlesex in December 1926. She competed in the women's shot put and the women's discus throw at the 1948 Summer Olympics. In 1963, she was living in Queensland, Australia.

References

1926 births
Living people
Athletes (track and field) at the 1948 Summer Olympics
British female shot putters
British female discus throwers
Olympic athletes of Great Britain
British expatriates in Australia